David North may refer to:

David North (politician) (born 1942), British politician
David North (socialist) (born 1950), American Trotskyist
David North (judge) (born 1956), Australian judge
David North (character), Marvel Comics character